ALi Corporation (also known as Acer Laboratories Incorporated or Acer Labs Inc., and commonly known as ALi) is a major designer and manufacturer of embedded systems integrated circuits, and a former manufacturer of personal computer integrated circuits. It is based in Taiwan, and is a subsidiary of the Acer group. 

The company was founded in 1987, its president is Teddy Lu. Part of ALi including the personal computer integrated circuits business was spun off as ULi Electronics Inc. in June 2003. ULi was acquired by Nvidia in 2006 for $52 million.

Products

Chipsets

80X86 Chipsets

Pentium and Socket 7 Chipsets

Slot 1 and Socket 370 Chipsets

Slot A and Socket A Chipsets

Socket 478 Chipsets

Socket 754/939/940 Chipsets

Southbridge Chips

VGA

  M3141
  M3143
 M3145A AliCat - PCI SVGA card, 2 MB DRAM, external RAMDAC, no DDC support - most likely S3 Trio64V+ compatible
 M3147V AliCat - PCI SVGA card, 2 MB (S3 Trio 64V+ compatible ?)
  M3149 GUI Accelerator, 4MB
  M3151 GUI Accelerator, 8 MB

Video

 M3307 MPEG-I Video Controller
 M3309 MPEG-II Video w/ Software Audio Decoder
 M3321 MPEG-II Audio/Video Decoder
 M3325 Video/Audio Decoder
 M3327 CPU
 M3328 CPU 

 M3329 CPU (MIPS architecture)
 A1 (216 pin)
 B1 (216 pin)
 C E1 (128 pin)
 PF (parallel)
 SF (serial)
 M3330 CPU

PC peripheral

 M5105, M5107, M5109, M5113, M5119 SuperIO chip
 M5123, M5125, M5132, M5135, M5140, M5145 SuperIO chip with KBC integrated
 M5253, M5271, M5273, M5622, M5633 USB/FireWire PCI chipsets
 M5281, M5283, M5619, M5621, M5636, M5637, M5642 PCI IDE
 M5455 PCI AC'97 Sound
 M5623 (USB 2.0), M5617 (USB 1.1) USB Scanner controller
 M5632 USB Host-to-host
 M5634, M5651 USB Flash Disk controller, probably clone of Phison chips
 M5635 USB Cardreader
 M5661, M5667, M7101, M7107, M7108 digital audio player controller
 M5818 RTC chip, clone of Motorola MC146818

For embedded systems

M6117 is a highly integrated, low voltage, single-chip implementation of the Intel 386SX compatible microprocessor plus ALi M1217 chipset. The M6117 provides a static 386SX core, DRAM controller, ISA bus logic, real time clock, keyboard controller, and power management unit.

M6032 is an 8051-based Microcontroller with Dual Data Pointers, UART, 32 I/O lines, 3 Timers/Counters, 6 Interrupts/2 priority levels, 256 Bytes IDATA RAM, 256 Bytes on-chip XRAM.

M6759 is an 8051-based Microcontroller with Dual Data Pointers, UART, 32 I/O lines, 3 Timers/Counters, 6 Interrupts/2 priority levels, 64 KB Flash ROM, 256 Bytes IDATA RAM, 256 Bytes on-chip XRAM.

See also
 Comparison of AMD chipsets
 Comparison of ATI chipsets
 List of Intel chipsets
 Comparison of Nvidia chipsets
 List of VIA chipsets

References

External links

 Official site
 Technical info (Chinese)

Laboratories Incorporated
Fabless semiconductor companies
Semiconductor companies of Taiwan
Taiwanese brands